San Remigio, officially the Municipality of San Remigio,  is a 3rd class municipality in the province of Antique, Philippines. According to the 2020 census, it has a population of 34,045 people. Making it 10th most populous municipality in the province of Antique and the largest municipality in terms of land area, with a total area of 406.98 square kilometers.

History
On the morning of September 12, 1988, Mayor Gideon Cabigunda was on the road to meet with former members of the communist rebel group the New People's Army (NPA) who have surrendered when he and four of his security aides were assassinated by other NPA rebels. Romilo Sequrra, a 19-year-old rebel, later surrendered to authorities from the Philippine Air Force and admitted to being part of the group that committed the assassination.

Geography

According to the Philippine Statistics Authority, the municipality has a land area of  constituting  of the  total area of Antique.

Almost 70% of its land area are mountainous and the remaining 30% comprise the flat lowland and rolling hills.

Agriculture occupies  of land.

Climate

Barangays
San Remigio is politically subdivided into 45 barangays.

Demographics

In the 2020 census, San Remigio had a population of 34,045.

Economy

One major contributor to the economic activity of the town is the remittances of the overseas contract workers.

Natural attractions
San Remigio is host to natural attractions like the Igbaclag Cave, Bato Cueva, Kanyugan Cave, Magpungay Cave, Pula Falls, Timbaban Falls and Batuan Falls, the lakes of Maylumboy and Danao, the stone of Datu Sumakwel, Bato Bintana and White Castle Stone, and the mountain ranges of San Remigio. The rivers are rich with gem stones and the biggest flower Rafflesia can be seen in the upland barangays of Tubudan and La Union.

Religious pilgrimage
Every April, thousands of people coming from different towns and even nearby provinces of various religious denominations flock the Diocesan Shrine of St. Vincent Ferrer of the Iglesia Filipina Independiente in Barangay Baladjay known as Banwang Daan ("Old Town"). The original statue of St. Vincent Ferrer is believed to be miraculous. From April 1 until the last Sunday of April, which is the celebration of its feast day, masses are offered daily. Faithfuls light candles, offer flowers and do the "palapak".

References

External links

[ Philippine Standard Geographic Code]

Municipalities of Antique (province)